Art Deco architecture flourished in New York City during the 1920s and 1930s. The style—characterized by ornament and verticality, as well as the use of contemporary materials—is found in government edifices, commercial projects, and residential buildings in all five boroughs. The architecture of the period was influenced not just by worldwide decorative arts trends and the rise of mechanization, but also New York City's 1916 Zoning Resolution which influenced the setback feature in most of the buildings.

Their proliferation fueled by the Roaring Twenties and commercial speculation, Art Deco buildings in the city range in size and sophistication from towering skyscrapers and office buildings to modest middle-class housing and municipal buildings. First defined by the colorful, lavishly-decorated skyscrapers of Manhattan, the Great Depression and changing tastes pushed Art Deco to more subdued applications as it proliferated in the 1930s. The lull in construction during World War II and rise of the International Style led to the end of new Art Deco in the city.

After falling out of favor and suffering from neglect during the city's downturn in the latter half of the 20th century, the city's Art Deco has been reappraised. Among New York's most treasured and recognizable buildings are the Art Deco Empire State Building and Chrysler Building, and Art Deco skyscrapers formed the core of the city's skyline for decades. Many of New York's Art Deco buildings are protected by historic preservation laws, while others have been lost to new development or neglect.

Background
 
American Art Deco has its origins in European arts, especially the style moderne popularized at the 1925 International Exhibition of Modern Decorative and Industrial Arts, from which Art Deco draws its name (Exposition internationale des arts décoratifs et industriels modernes). While the United States would not officially participate, Americans—including New York City architect Irwin Chanin—visited the exposition, and the government sent a delegation to the expo. Their resulting reports helped spread the style to America. Other influences included German expressionism, the Austrian Secession, art nouveau, cubism, and the ornament of African and Central and South American cultures. American Art Deco architecture would take on different forms in different regions of the country, influenced by local culture, laws, and tastes.

Art Deco came into style just as New York City was being rapidly transformed. An exploding population, flush economic times, cheap credit, and lax zoning combined to encourage a building boom. The real estate market was so frenetic that buildings that had stood for just a few years were regularly torn down for newer construction. Builders demolished twice as many buildings as went up, with the new buildings occupying multiple old lots. The amount of office space in New York City increased by 92% in the late 1920s.

In New York City specifically, zoning regulations had major impacts on the design of its buildings. The proliferation of ever-larger skyscrapers like the 40-story Equitable Building spurred the city's passage of the United States' first citywide zoning code, the 1916 Zoning Resolution. The regulations, intended to prevent tall buildings from cutting off light and air at street level, required buildings to "set back" from street level depending on the width of the street and the zoned area. Once a building rose up and set back to cover 25 percent of the lot, clients and architects were unrestrained as to the height of their project. The impact of the new regulations was not felt until later in the decade, as the United States's entry into World War I slowed construction.

Early buildings built to conform to the new codes did so unimaginatively—the Heckscher Building in Midtown (completed 1921) set back evenly like a stack of boxes as it rose—but more inspired interpretations of the law would follow. A major influence on the resulting skyscrapers was Eliel Saarinen's second-place design entry for Chicago's Tribune Tower, considered a new skyscraper style unmoored from earlier Gothic or Classical architecture. Also influential were architect and illustrator Hugh Ferriss' series of speculative architectural illustrations exploring how to make buildings that met the zoning requirements. Ferriss' illustrations envisioned buildings as sculptural forms rather than simple boxes. Architect Talbot Hamlin described Ferriss' work as "a magic wand to set the American city architecture free from its nightmare [...] No longer was the high building apparently built by the mile and cut off to order, but it was composed break upon break, buttress on buttress. The possibilities of poetry entered in."

Precursors to the Art Deco skyscrapers that would soon go up across the city were buildings such as Raymond Hood's American Radiator Building (1924), which was neo-Gothic in general style but featured abstract ornament that would characterize Art Deco. Another early transitional building was the Madison Belmont Building at 181 Madison Avenue (1924–1925), which featured traditional ornamentation and organization on upper floors, combined with Art Deco motifs on the lower floors. The ironwork was provided by Edgar Brandt, who contributed the entrance gates to the 1925 Paris Exhibition. One of the first "true" Art Deco skyscrapers was the New York Telephone Company Building, built between 1923–1927 and designed by Ralph Thomas Walker. Its muted color and ornament did not fully demonstrate the style that would soon flourish across the city, but its massing and verticality were thoroughly modern and broke with established architectural styles.

Common elements
The buildings that would later be described as Art Deco shared common elements. The setback laws resulted in sculptural buildings with long, uninterrupted piers rising between columns of windows and decorated spandrels. These choices were made to emphasize the height of the buildings, a choice mimicked even on much shorter buildings built across town. New York's architects were at the forefront of using new materials, including synthetics like Bakelite and Formica plastics, as well as Nirosta, a corrosion-resistant steel alloy that made exterior metal on skyscrapers more feasible. Where stainless steel was too expensive to use, aluminum's declining price and lighter weight made it a common choice for interior and exterior usage. Other favored materials were multicolored terra cotta, limestone, and glass brick. Even when traditional building materials were used—marble, wood, brick, bronze—they would be combined in novel ways, intending to shock and delight.

Architectural historian Rosemarie Haag Bletter described the most pronounced element of Art Deco as its use of "sumptuous ornament". The most dynamic elements were reserved for entrances and at the tops of buildings, with multiple materials combined to form dazzling colors or rich textures. Sometimes the buildings were shaded—using darker-colored materials at the base, and then gradually lightening towards the top—to increase the building's visibility. Art Deco buildings in the city were also richly appointed inside and out with reliefs, mosaics, murals, and other art. Allegorical depictions—such as beehives of industry on the French Building, personifications of virtues at Rockefeller Center, or figures portraying industry and the arts at the International Magazine Building—were common decorative elements. The entries and lobbies of these skyscrapers often drew direct influence from the painted sets and stages of theaters, with framing like hanging curtains. Elaborate ironwork blended with decorative frosted or etched glass.

Art Deco in New York became intrinsically linked with commercial architecture. Its focus on rich ornamentation appealed to commercial patrons who wanted an "acceptable" modern style. These developers in turn gave architects a permissive mandate to create in the style, as long as the end result was not too shocking. The buildings rose to the height where the cost of added space equalized with the commercial value of that space. The emerging style was contemporaneously called the "vertical style", "skyscraper style", or simply "modern", with the characteristic look of setback buildings leading to them being called "wedding cake" buildings. Architect Ely Jacques Kahn commented in 1926 on the emerging style that his brethren were creating with their buildings:

[It] is so characteristic of New York that it would be more logical, by far, to call it a New York Style. [...] Decoration becomes a far more precious thing than a collection of dead leaves, swags, bull's heads and cartouches. It becomes a means of enriching the surface with a play of light and shade, voices and solids. [Today's ornamental forms] respond to the bulk and simplicity of the skyscraper itself.

The demand for modern buildings was such that even architectural firms known for more restrained and classical designs adopted the new style. Cross & Cross's main practice was for discreet townhomes and banks, but in the late 1920s they produced modern skyscrapers such as the RCA Victor Building. The 50-story skyscraper turned Gothic tracery into stylized lightning bolts. Another conservative firm that moved to modernistic designs was Walker & Gillette, whose best-known Art Deco building in New York is the Fuller Building. Buildings already being constructed were sometimes appended with Art Deco flourishes; the Paramount Building (1926) had an Art Deco clock tower appended to a Beaux-Arts base. These buildings were constructed either as headquarters for established and emerging companies, or else speculative projects where the money would be drawn from renting out the space in the new building. The design of speculative buildings was chiefly driven by maximizing rentable space, whereas corporate buildings served as advertisements for the corporations themselves—spending money not for direct financial gain, but what architect Timothy L. Pflueger termed "special architectural appeal". Even with these corporate buildings, however, the owners would often lend space to smaller businesses and treat them as real estate investments. The look of the buildings often spoke to the business conducted there; the RCA Victor Building's wave motifs represent the power of radio, while the Chrysler Building would have ornamental touches of radiators and hubcaps for the automobile company. The McGraw-Hill Building, New Yorker Hotel, and Daily News Building feature their names in prominent signage or embedded into the facade. Because the true shape of the building was often hard to grasp for a street-level observer, many of the skyscrapers featured miniature versions of themselves as part of their ground-level decoration.

In the Financial District and downtown Manhattan, the skyline was quickly transformed by the proliferation of Art Deco high-rises. The New York Telephone Company Building was decorated with motifs derived from Aztec designs, and the lobby featured a vaulting ceiling with frescoes detailing the history of communication. Other notable Art Deco skyscrapers in downtown include the Irving Trust Company Building (1929–1931), designed with a "curtain" exterior and Hildreth Meiere-produced mosaics in the interior; 120 Wall Street (1929–1930), with a wedding-cake form and a red granite and limestone base; and the City Bank-Farmers Trust Building (1930–1931), featuring abstract heads along the facade looking down at street level, and bronzed doors featuring transportation methods. The final skyscraper built before World War II in the Financial District was 70 Pine Street, completed in 1932. It featured unique double-deck elevators servicing two lobby floors, designed to maximize the profitable space of the small plot.

In comparison to downtown, which already had skyscrapers dating to the previous century and fewer available plots, Midtown Manhattan was only just beginning to develop its skyline as Art Deco became popular. Its business district was booming after the construction of Grand Central Terminal and the undergrounding of train tracks opening up new plots for development. 42nd Street became Midtown's major Art Deco thoroughfare, hosting some of the city's most famous skyscrapers. One of the earliest was the Chanin Building (1927–1929), headquarters for the Chanin Construction Company. It featured buttresses evocative of miniature skyscrapers on the exterior, along with abstract floral reliefs on the lower floors. Inside, the lobby included bronze grills that laud the economic opportunity of the city.

New York's architects were caught in a furious race for the title of tallest building in the world, and several Art Deco buildings vied for the title. By the end of 1930 more than 11 building plans had more than 60 floors; among them were the Chrysler Building and the Empire State Building, both of which increased in height from earlier drafts. In competition with 40 Wall Street for the title of the tallest building, William Van Alen secretly constructed the Chrysler Building's  steel spire within the building itself, hoisting it and securing it into position in a single day, claiming the title of the tallest building. The triumph was short-lived; a month later Al Smith updated the plans for the Empire State Building, adding more stories and a 200-foot spire of its own.

The Chrysler Building's spire went up just one day before the October 1929 Wall Street Crash that triggered the economic turmoil of the Great Depression. The immediate impact of the Depression was a reduction in building of all kinds; one architectural firm went from 17 filed plans for buildings up to 30 stories in 1929 to just three plans in 1930, the tallest being four stories. The scope of some existing construction was also downsized; the Metropolitan Life Company intended to capture the title for tallest building with the Metropolitan Life North Building, but construction stopped during the downturn and never resumed, leaving it an "enormous stump" of 31 stories instead of the planned hundred. In the shadow of the deepening Depression, the Metropolitan Opera abandoned its plans to move to a new three-block complex financed by John D. Rockefeller Jr. Rockefeller decided to proceed with the project, hiring three different architectural firms. The architects envisioned a plan for buildings arranged on several axes, clad in the same materials. At the center was 30 Rockefeller Plaza. The Rockefellers earmarked $150,000 ($ adjusted for inflation) for art in the plaza alone, filling the space with paintings, reliefs, and sculptural forms. The decorative features focus on the achievements of humankind, mythology, and stories of education and commerce.

Art Deco in the city

Commercial
The heyday of Art Deco skyscrapers was effectively ended by the Great Depression, but Art Deco had proliferated outwards across the city in myriad forms. Art Deco proved a popular style for an expanding range of modern commercial edifices that proliferated during the period—department stores, news offices, and transportation. The initial prevailing wisdom was that the real estate market would quickly recover. To tide landowners over until economic conditions improved, many built "taxpayers" on their lots—single or two-story buildings. Despite being intended as temporary, many of these buildings remained for decades afterward. One such Art Deco taxpayer was the East River Savings Bank on 22 Cortlandt Street, which replaced a fifteen-story building from the 1890s. The New York Times dubbed the lot "the most valuable piece of New York real estate for a taxpayer in the city." Despite being a more modest building, the structure is appointed with polished stone eagles, interior marble, and at one time featured a  mural of the East River. Completed speculative buildings faced issues in the difficult economy—the Empire State Building took more in as a tourist attraction than from tenants, and office buildings across Midtown felt pinched by the Rockefeller Center's aggressive tactics to lure and keep tenants.

As the 1930s progressed, the rental market began to improve, and the pace of construction increased. The buildings that went up in this period tended to be more reserved, with grayer, more austere versions of Art Deco; Bletter suggests that this change was due to the influence of mechanization, and the lush, colorful look of the earlier style now appearing "frivolous". Terra cotta decoration was replaced with smoother, rounded surfaces, and metal-clad streamlining influenced by vehicular designs. Throughout the Art Deco period, brick was the most common building material for ordinary buildings, but even here bricklayers would create geometric designs by alternating the color of brick or the coursing.

Art Deco was a popular choice for the movie theaters and stages being built at the time, an apropos choice given that Art Deco itself found influence in design from films, including German Expressionist works such as Fritz Lang's Metropolis. Art Deco theaters in the city included the Ziegfeld Theater, an explicit example of the building-as-set metaphor, with the facade including a proscenium to mirror the one indoors. As the Roaring Twenties ended, so too did the era of the large movie palace, and smaller Art Deco theaters like the Metro Theater on the Upper West Side and the RKO Midway Theater in Ridgewood, Queens served more modest audiences. 

As the city developed northward, Manhattan's most prestigious department and retail stores moved to Midtown. Along Fifth Avenue, the rise of the Empire State and new Deco buildings corresponded with the street's transformation from a "millionaire's mile" of wealthy residences to middle-class commercial business. The Tiffany & Co. flagship store at 727 Fifth Avenue, built 1940, was designed to feature luxurious amenities including central air conditioning. Its exterior features stainless steel window frames paired with marble and limestone, intended to connect the Deco building to classical architecture. At 59th Street, Bloomingdale's expanded to encompass an entire city block in 1930, with the new addition featuring a black and gold facade festooned with decorative metal grills. Other notable Deco department stores across the city include the Sears Roebuck & Company Department Store in Flatbush, Brooklyn, and the Montgomery Ward Department Store in Jamaica, Queens.

Other major Deco commercial buildings in the city included a number of hotels, including the Waldorf Astoria hotel. The original Waldorf-Astoria had been demolished to make way for the Empire State Building, and the new building drew influence from it, designed more like a skyscraper than a traditional hotel. Architects Schultz & Weaver designed twin limestone and brick towers, and included a suite for the president and a private rail line from Grand Central. Apartment hotels flourished in this period as a way of enjoying luxurious living without the expense of maintaining a private home. The Essex House was at the time of its construction one of the city's largest apartment hotels. It features gilded frozen fountain motifs and floral patterns rising above its main entrance. Further uptown, the Carlyle Hotel combined two buildings (one an apartment house, the other the hotel) and drew influence from Westminster Cathedral, albeit with modern Deco touches; the facade is broken up with beige terra cotta stripes inscribed with geometric V's and plant forms.

Residential

Alongside the commercial boom of the 1920s, New York experienced a huge increase in residential construction; 20 percent of all new housing built in the United States in that decade was built in New York. Apartment buildings grew from 39 percent of construction in 1919 to 77 percent in 1926. The Art Deco era paralleled New Yorkers' shift away from tenement-style housing (multifamily homes with shared facilities) and row houses, towards apartment buildings (single-family rooms with separate bathrooms). Developers began building apartments targeting the middle class. Urban Art Deco was a way of appealing to prospective renters and keep them in the city, rather than the suburbs. The growth of the subway drove new Art Deco architecture as well. Developers built new speculative housing in the undeveloped areas the new subway lines reached, and New York's population diffused outward. The great majority of these new apartments throughout the boroughs topped out at six stories, because building seven stories or taller required more expensive fireproof materials. The downturn in the housing market of the 1930s encouraged New Dealers to focus on nonprofit and limited-profit housing to renew blighted parts of the city or expand beyond its current limits. Examples of these limited-profit housing initiatives can be found throughout the boroughs, especially in Sunnyside, Queens. To save money, the middle-class Art Deco often used "cast stone" (concrete) instead of expensive carved stone, reusing molds to repeat designs and shapes.  

In Manhattan, Art Deco apartments sprouted up across the borough. On the Upper East Side, Raymond Hood and John Mead Howells were commissioned to build a small apartment building in 1927 by the owner of the Daily News. Its ten floors features silver window spandrels with geometric designs and zigzags, and was awarded a medal by the American Institute of Architects for demonstrating a pioneering form of the new modern architectural style. One of the only known Art Deco townhouses was built nearby on East 80th Street as a residence for the banker Lionello Perera. Its modest brick facade is broken up by different patterns, with geometric stone bands separating stories and a decorative metal entrance. The residence would later be owned by Art Deco collector Barbara Streisand, making it her largest piece.

Across town, some of the first large apartment buildings to receive influence from the Art Deco office buildings and skyscrapers downtown were the sister buildings The Majestic and The Century. Together with The Eldorado, designed by Margon & Holder in association with Emory Roth, these twin-towered apartments transformed Central Park West's skyline. Roth generally avoided modernistic designs in his output (The San Remo and The Beresford in the same area would be Italianate in style) but he would contribute further Deco apartments in this part of town, including the Ardsley at 320 Central Park West. Towards the end of the 1930s more streamline moderne designs such as The Normandy (Roth again) and 10 West 74th Street (H. Herbert Lilien) had more subdued brick and horizontal speed lines. In northern Manhattan, Washington Heights filled with more modest Deco apartments, featuring amenities such as sunken living rooms, casement windows, and elevators.

In Brooklyn, apartments and homes in the 1920s and 30s filled the previously sparsely-populated land from the island's terminal moraine down to the southern shore. Art Deco apartments and commercial buildings would change the character of new or redeveloping neighborhoods. Ocean Avenue and stretches of Kings Highway filled with a number of Art Deco apartment houses, such as 832 Ocean Avenue, built in 1931 by prolific Brooklyn architects Navy & Kavovitt. Clad in yellow brick, piers capped with cast stone emphasize verticality and evoke the skyscrapers in Manhattan. In Brighton Beach, the old hotels and racetracks of the area gave way to Deco apartments, including 711 Brightwater Court (1934), appointed with riotously-colored terra cotta in jungle and geometric patterns.

The densest concentration of Art Deco buildings in New York is in the west Bronx centered along the Grand Concourse, with roughly 300 buildings constructed between 1935 and 1941. Many of the buildings share styles and architects with the apartment houses across the river in Washington Heights. One of the first, and grandest, Art Deco apartments along the Concourse was the Park Plaza Apartments, completed 1931. Intended to rise ten stories before being damaged by fire during construction, the final building is eight stories and decorated with bright polychromatic terra cotta. Park Plaza was the first Bronx Deco apartments by Horace Ginsbern & Associates, who would help change the face of the borough. These buildings featured Deco hallmarks of geometric patterns and colored brick, with indirectly lit public interiors floored with tile, framed with metal, and capped by mosaic ceilings. Private interiors featured sunken living rooms, wrap-around windows in the corners, and ample closet space; inside and out these apartments were designed to appeal to the fashion-conscious, "new money" middle class. Compared to the famous architects of Manhattan who often studied at prestigious schools, many of the architects of the Deco in the outer boroughs were Jewish, studied at local art schools, and were forgotten in a generation.

Public works

The pace of public works spending increased after World War I, and especially during the Depression. Mayor Fiorello H. La Guardia saw the Depression as an opportunity to remake the city, and spearheaded a bevy of public works projects. The city benefited greatly from Franklin Roosevelt's New Deal Works Progress Administration program, established to provide relief. In 1935 and 1936, the city alone received one-seventh of all WPA funds. The money went to projects such as a network of public pools across the city, with Crotona Park in the Bronx and Tompkinsville Pool in Staten Island being built with Art Deco flourishes.

Art Deco's influence affected many aspects of New York's public works during this period; by the late 1930s, most Art Deco buildings were municipal projects, not commercial ones. The Health Building at 125 Worth Street (c. 1932–1935) has metal grillwork and health-related designs around the entrances, designed by German craftsman Oscar Bruno Bach, who produced custom metalwork for the Chrysler and Empire State Buildings. Other Art Deco sanitation buildings include the Tallman Island Water Pollution Control Plant in Queens and the Manhattan Grit Chamber in East Harlem. Art Deco libraries from the period include the Central Library of the Brooklyn Public Library. Though construction began in 1911, by 1930 it was still incomplete. The Library hired new architects in 1935 that hewed to the original footprint, but discarded the Greco-Roman elements for a modern look. The resulting facade is sparsely ornamented, with the main decoration being fifty-foot pylons illustrating the arts and sciences with gilded images, flanking entry doors surrounded by gilded bronze reliefs of figures from American literature.

Art Deco is also represented in the city's transportation and mass transit networks. The Independent Subway System (IND) subway lines have stations designed from the late 1920s on. Squire J. Vickers, who designed hundreds of stops for the city's subways, designed Art Deco edifices for stops such as the 181st Street station in Washington Heights, the Fourth Avenue/Ninth Street station in Park Slope, the York Street station in Dumbo, and IND substations like that on West 53rd Street in Midtown. Other major Art Deco projects included the New York Municipal Airport, of which Marine Air Terminal remains, and the ventilation tunnels and portals of the Lincoln Tunnel, which opened in 1937 and connect New Jersey and Manhattan.

The first Art Deco school in the city was Public School 98 in the Bronx, one of the first new schools built to establish a separate junior high school program in the city. Public School 98 was joined by Joan of Arc High School on the Upper West Side, one of the first buildings designed by Eric Kebbon, school buildings superintendent on the New York Board of Education who would ultimately design more than 100 schools for the city. The High School was designed more like a skyscraper than a traditional school building, with long brick piers rising up to accommodate two thousand students. The triple-height entranceway contains an inscription of the school's name and symbols from the story of Joan of Arc. Other schools include Samuel Gompers Industrial High School in the Bronx, and the former Public School 48 in Queens.

Religious structures

Few religious buildings in the Art Deco style were built in New York City; artist Don Vlack wrote that the architects may have felt confined to more traditional styles given their conservative congregations. The Church of the Heavenly Rest and St. Luke's Lutheran Church have Art Deco elements to their more traditional, Neo-gothic elements, while the Society for the Advancement of Judaism blends modern elements with traditional Jewish motifs rather than geometric forms, with some calling the result "Modern Semetic". The Fourth Church of Christ, Scientist (now a synagogue) is a rare example of Christian Science Art Deco anywhere in the country, while the Rego Park Synagogue provides a late example of an Art Deco synagogue. Other buildings include the Trinity Baptist Church and Temple Emanu-El of New York in the Upper East Side.

Decline and legacy

A 1932 Museum of Modern Art architecture exhibit introduced the International Style to New Yorkers. Where Art Deco favored ornamentation, International Style favored undecorated facades; Bletter summed up the difference between the ethos of International Style as "less is more", and Art Deco as "more than enough." International Style buildings, with their emphasis on airy glass and the horizontal, were now modern and exciting, while Art Deco became seen as outmoded and linked to the tough times of the Depression. The International Style and modernism replaced Art Deco as it fell out of favor during and after World War II; many smaller commercial buildings remodeled to fit the newest tastes.

In comparison to the International Style, Art Deco's role as the first international style, and its importance, were largely forgotten. Art Deco was not reappraised and formally named and categorized as a style until the 1960s. Writing in 1975, Cervin Robinson noted that by the standard of direct stylistic influence, Art Deco had virtually no impact on contemporary buildings—but by its impact on the character of New York itself, Art Deco "helped crystallize our image of Gotham."

The downturn in New York City's fortunes in the latter half of the 20th century caused the damage and loss of many Art Deco buildings. Smaller commercial buildings and theaters were often completely lost, while by the 1970s few Deco skyscrapers still had intact lobbies. Horace Ginsbern's Noonan Plaza Apartments on the Grand Concourse suffered from heavy vandalism, with skylights ripped from frames to sell for scrap metal. It was eventually restored thanks to the efforts of Ginsbern's son and a new owner. The desirability of Art Deco objects has led buildings to be stripped of their ornamentation inside and out to be resold piecemeal.

The modern historical preservation movement in New York City was sparked by the loss of Old Penn Station in the 1960s, leading to the establishment of the New York City Landmarks Preservation Commission. Don Vlack considered the fact that no Deco buildings had been landmarked by 1974 an example of the lingering bias against the style. Some of the first Art Deco buildings protected were the Chrysler Building and Chanin Building in 1978. Some building owners fought some or all of the designation; General Electric successfully fought the interior landmark designation for the RCA Victory Building, and Radio City Music Hall's interiors were landmarked only after a contentious battle with the Music Hall's owners, who wished to demolish it. The Landmarks Commission received more than 100,000 signatures urging the landmark status. 

Some Art Deco buildings were demolished before they were eligible for protection, such as the 12-story Bonwit Teller building at Fifth Avenue and 57th Street. Donald Trump demolished the building in 1980, with the limestone reliefs Trump had promised to the Metropolitan Museum of Art instead jackhammered and destroyed. Other Art Deco losses, such as the New Market Building in the South Street Seaport, were surrounded by landmarked districts but were not old enough to be initially included, and had landmarked status later denied. To avoid landmark status, landowners will sometimes rush to demolish the building or deface the facade. Given that interiors and exteriors of buildings are landmarked separately, even landmarked buildings can see their unique Deco features lost—such as the McGraw-Hill Building, whose unique streamlined metal and enamel lobby was destroyed in a 2021 renovation.

Groups such as the Art Deco Society of New York (ADSNY) produce talks and tours about the city's architecture, as well as advocating for the preservation of the city's remaining Deco. New York City Landmarks Commission veteran Anthony W. Robins wrote that decades after the rise and fall of Art Deco, the style "survives and flourishes" in New York, with the once-daring buildings having become historic landmarks of the city.

Landmarked buildings
Below is a listing of city-landmarked Art Deco buildings within New York City. Items marked with a dagger (†) are also (or alternatively) listed on the National Register of Historic Places, those with a double dagger (‡) have landmarked interiors, and those with a section sign (§) are National Historic Landmarks.

See also 

 List of Art Deco architecture in New York (state)

References

Further reading

External links
 Art Deco Society of New York Art Deco registry—partial listing of Art Deco structures still standing

 
20th-century architecture